Königsstuhl (King's Chair) is the best-known chalk cliff on the Stubbenkammer in Jasmund National Park on the Baltic Sea island of Rügen.

In 2004, Königsstuhl was incorporated into the terrain of Königsstuhl National Park Centre. Since 2004, entry to the National Park Centre, and hence access to Königsstuhl, has been subject to a charge.

The narrow yet massive granite steps that lead to the plateau on Königsstuhl,  in area, lie over the site of what is suspected to be a Bronze Age barrow. From the plateau there is a sweeping view of the Baltic Sea.  Königsstuhl itself is best seen from the viewing point of Victoria View (Victoria-Sicht) to the south.

There is a legend that the name Königsstuhl ("King's Chair") goes back to an event in 1715 when the Swedish king Charles XII is supposed to have commanded a sea battle against the Danes from this spot. The battle tired the ruler so much that he needed to take a chair.

However, the name Königsstuhl was used in a travel report by the vicar, Rhenan, in 1586, who had been tasked by the Pomeranian duke to find mineral springs; thus it is clear that it had been named much earlier.

According to a legend, the name is actually derived from a custom whereby in ancient times the person elected king was the first to climb the cliffs from the sea and sit in the chair on the top.

External links 

 Jasmund National Park pictures and information about the chalk cliffs (English)
 nationalpark-jasmund.de (German)

Rock formations of Germany
Hills of Mecklenburg-Western Pomerania
Sassnitz
Geography of Rügen